Aphonopelma superstitionense is a species of spiders in the family Theraphosidae, found in United States (Arizona and New Mexico).

References

superstitionense
Spiders described in 2016
Spiders of the United States